Gustav Torgny Lindgren (16 June 1938 – 16 March 2017) was a Swedish writer.

Lindgren was the son of Andreas Lindgren and Helga Björk. He studied in Umeå to become a teacher and worked as a teacher until the middle of the 1970s. For several years he was active as a local politician for the Swedish Social Democratic Party. In the 1980s he converted to the Catholic faith.

Lindgren began as a poet in 1965 but had to wait until 1982 for his breakthrough, with the novel The Way of a Serpent (Swedish: Ormens väg på hälleberget). Lindgren's work was translated into more than thirty languages and was one of Sweden's most internationally successful contemporary writers. He became a member of the Swedish Academy in 1991.

The Way of a Serpent
The Way of a Serpent tells the story of a farmer family in a poverty-stricken region in the northern parts of Sweden in the nineteenth century. The family formerly owned its land, but had to sell it cheap during a succession of years of famine. The new owner collects his rent as long as there is money in the household, and exploits the women when there is no money.

The novel was made into a film by Bo Widerberg in 1986.

Bibliography
 Plåtsax, hjärtats instrument (1965)
 Dikter från Vimmerby (1970)
 Hur skulle det vara om man vore Olof Palme? (1971)
 Hallen (1975). 
 Brännvinsfursten (1979). A book about Lars Olsson Smith. 
 The Way of a Serpent (Ormens väg på hälleberget) (1982/1990).  / 
 Merabs skönhet (1983). 
 Övriga frågor (1983). 
 Bathsheba (Bat Seba) (1984/1989).   / 
 Legender (1986). 
 Skrämmer dig minuten (1986)
 Light (Ljuset) (1987/1992).  / 
 Till Sanningens Lov (In Praise of Truth) (1991)
 Sweetness (Hummelhonung) (1995/2000).  / 
 I Brokiga Blads vatten (1999). 
 Hash (Pölsan) (2002/2005).  / 
 Dorés bibel (Doré's Bible) (2005).
 The Stories (Berättelserna) (2003). 
 Norrlands akvavit (2007)
 Minnen (2010)
 Klingsor (2014)

Awards and honours
Lindgren received honorary doctorates from Linköping University (in 1990) and Umeå University (in 2000). He also received a number of other awards, including the following.
 1986 – Prix Femina étranger (for Bathsheba)
 1995 – The August Prize (for Sweetness'')
 2000 – The Selma Lagerlöf Prize
 2001 – Ordre des Arts et des Lettres  
 2002 – Litteris et Artibus
 2004 – De Nios Stora Pris

References

1938 births
2017 deaths
People from Norsjö Municipality
Members of the Swedish Academy
Swedish-language writers
20th-century Swedish novelists
21st-century Swedish novelists
Converts to Roman Catholicism
Swedish Roman Catholics
Prix Femina Étranger winners
Selma Lagerlöf Prize winners
Dobloug Prize winners
Litteris et Artibus recipients
August Prize winners
Swedish male novelists
Writers from Västerbotten